Punk's Not Dead (translit. Pankot ne e mrtov) is a 2011 Macedonian comedy film written and directed by Vladimir Blaževski. The film was selected as the Macedonian entry for the Best Foreign Language Film at the 84th Academy Awards, but it did not make the final shortlist.

Plot 
Mirsa (played by Simonov) is an aging punk who struggles for everyday life in Skopje. In the early 1990s, his rock group, which had a cult status at the time, disbanded. One day, Mirsa receives an offer, together with his old group, to play at a celebration in Debar. He agrees and goes in search of the other members of the group, with the help of his ex-girlfriend.

Cast
 Jordančo Čevrevski
 Flora Dostovska as Mimi
 Kiril Pop Hristov as Pasha
 Viktor Lazarevski as Slovenec
 Jovica Mihajlovski as Guru
 Toni Mihajlovski as Ljak
 Emir Redžepi as Sali
 Jordan Simonov as Mirsa
 Kamka Točinovski as Nina
 Vladimir Tuliev as Zuti

See also
 List of submissions to the 84th Academy Awards for Best Foreign Language Film
 List of Macedonian submissions for the Academy Award for Best Foreign Language Film

References

External links
 

2011 films
2011 comedy films
Macedonian comedy films
Macedonian-language films